Philoxenus is a crater on Mercury. Its name was adopted by the International Astronomical Union (IAU) in 1976. Philoxenus is named for Greek lyric poet Philoxenus of Cythera.

A prominent but unnamed catena trends northeast from near the south rim of Philoxenus.  The small crater Waters is east of Philoxenus.

References

Impact craters on Mercury